Khamhria is a town and a nagar panchayat in Bemetara district in the Indian state of Chhattisgarh.

Geography

Demographics
 India census, Than-Khamhria had a population of 6798. Males constitute 51% of the population and females 49%. Than-Khamhria has an average literacy rate of 63%, higher than the national average of 59.5%: male literacy is 72%, and female literacy is 53%. In Than-Khamhria, 14% of the population is under 6 years of age.

References

Cities and towns in Durg district